The men's team modern pentathlon event was a multi-sport combined event at the 1968 Summer Olympics. It was the 5th consecutive Games at which the team event was held after being introduced in 1952. The competition involved riding, fencing, shooting, swimming, and running. The scores from the individual competition were used for the team score; there was no separate competition.

The event resulted in the first Olympic competitor being disqualified for doping. Hans-Gunnar Liljenwall was disqualified for alcohol use after drinking beer before the shooting phase.

Results

References

1968 in modern pentathlon
1968